Hantharwady United Football Club is a professional football club, based in Bago, Myanmar, and represents the Bago Region. The club was a founding member of the Myanmar National League (MNL) in 2009. It finished in sixth place in the league's inaugural cup competition, the MNL Cup 2009. In 2012, the club changed its name from Okktha United to Hantharwady United. As Okktha United, the club won their first ever major trophy by winning the MFF Cup in 2010.

History

2009
Hantharwady United FC was a founding member of the MNL in 2009 as Okktha United. This team represents the Bago Region. The team owner is Aung Moe Kyaw of International Beverages Trading (IBT).

2013–14
Hantharwady United was relegated to MNL-2. Hantharwady became champions of MNL-2 and were promoted to the MNL. Bamba scored 24 goals while Hantharwady United were in MNL-2.

2019-2020

At the end of the 2019 season, Hantharwady United appointed Myo Min Tun (former Yangon United coach) as their head coach. The team kicked off the 2020 Myanmar National League with a 1–0 win over Rakhine United F.C. at Bago, claiming an instant fourth spot. Since a win against Chin United F.C. in Week 3, Hantharwady United maintained its 1st position in the league for 15 consecutive weeks, until Week 18. During this time, Hantharwady United won 13 games, drew 1 and lost 2, while scoring 42 goals and conceding only 12. In the following week, Hantharwady United surprisingly lost to Magwe, which meant that the team shifted to 2nd place while Shan United took over after a long run of consecutive wins. Hantharwady United drew to Ayeyawady United in their last match of 2020 Myanmar National League, finishing as the runner-up behind the champions Shan United just by a point. The 18 year old winger Hein Htet Aung laid on the most assists (9 assists) while Ko Ko Naing kept the most cleansheets (9 cleansheets) in the league. In addition, the Ivorian forward Donald Bissa and Hein Htet Aung won Player Of The Month once each with coach Myo Min Tun also winning the Manager Of The Month twice.

Due to the COVID-19 pandemic, General Aung San Shield was postponed, meaning Hantharwady United were guaranteed a spot in the play-off round of 2021 AFC Cup, which will be their first appearance in a continental competition.

2020-2021

To prepare for the upcoming 2021 Myanmar National League and 2021 AFC Cup,  Hantharwady United have signed the veteran Pyae Phyo Aung (goalkeeper) from Southern Myanmar F.C. and Ye Yint Aung from Yadanarbon F.C. More signings will be made upon coach Myo Min Tun's decision over the transfer window.

Sponsors and manufacturers

Stadium
Grand Royal Stadium is a multi-purpose stadium in the city of Bago, Myanmar.  It is currently used mostly for football matches.  The stadium holds 7,000.

Stadium and locations

Honours

Cup
 General Aung San Shield
 Winners (1): 2010

Season-by-season record

2023 Final squad

Coaching staff

Managerial history
Head coaches by years (2018–present)

References

 
Association football clubs established in 2009
Myanmar National League clubs
2009 establishments in Myanmar